Aethiopes is a studio album by American rapper Billy Woods, released April 8, 2022, by Backwoodz Studioz. The cover art is taken from the Rembrandt painting Two Moors, and the album name comes from an ancient European name for African people. The album came along with the announcement of a US tour running May through October 2022, and an appearance at the Dutch music festival Le Guess Who? in November.

Style and reception 

 Per Pitchforks Dean Van Nguyen, the "maverick" Woods needs "a collaborator draped in enchantments and silk; an eclectic crate digger who shares his phosphorescent tendencies" and Preservation is suited for that role, crafting an album that "skids across eras, countries, and cultures", such as opener "Asylum" which contains "swirling sounds of piano keys, delicate guitars, and snaking brass riffs that appear sourced from old North East Africa or Middle Eastern music." Spectrum Cultures Thomas Stremfel notes a similarity with fellow New York rapper Ka which "isn't a complete coincidence considering Preservation's work with Ka under their Dr. Yen Lo project." The beat on fourth track "Sauvage" is "a Rube Goldberg machine with every percussion hit triggering another in a sparse, unending loop as Woods spins a handful of tales with rarely clear beginnings or ends." Woods' storytelling is "unmatched even relative to his own past material" and his "star-studded feature onslaught [of] the New York underground's best" never phone it in, but after a string of feature-heavy tracks, the featureless closing two feel like "tonal whiplash, tuning back into your regularly scheduled program." But ultimately, it is a "slight distraction" with Preservation "mak[ing] the most of each artist's potential set against Woods' consistent production aesthetics."

Beats Per Minutes Rob Hakimian notes that "with the title Aethiopes being an ancient word for African, the cover image borrowed from the 1661 painting Two Moors by Dutch master Rembrandt, and a song called "Haarlem" after the Dutch city near Amsterdam that would eventually give name to the multi-cultural area of New York City, there is evidently a grander narrative about slavery, historical immigration and the Black diaspora at large at play." Woods "is drawing from pockets of African and European history" while Preservation "is pulling obscure samples from geographical sources that perfectly interlock with the tone and concept." The producer is "tuned into the rapper's heady concepts and is dreaming up the vision right alongside him from first thought to last" with a "symbiosis between producer and rapper [which] is key to the album's unmitigated success." Pres "arms the rapper with the perfectly-sourced sounds and samples for each of his forays" including a "drone of African horns" on "No Hard Feelings" whose "shifting pitch pushing Woods' bars to greater, more exasperated lengths as he flits from one African's horrific demise to the next", "Wharves" which "features whispered percussion that is dominated by the glassy echoes of mbira – a usually joyous sound that becomes hollow and cold when combined with the rapper's words about shipwrecked German colonisers turning to cannibalism to survive", and "The Doldrums" with an instrumental "so stutteringly atmospheric that it feels zombified, while Woods shifts between times and settings with hallucinogenic fluidity; images of horses being thrown overboard mingle with snapshots of dirty urban corners, all interspersed with unsettling lessons." Woods and Pres have "made an album that lures you in with rhymes and tones that are perfectly attuned to each other, augment each other and make it clear that there is something important being told here", comparing their narrative-building work to "heavily stylised comic strips – though these are more Alan Moore than weekend funnies." Aethiopes "overwhelming atmosphere invites you to pore over the tracks, to take in each detail the light reaches, then comb over them again for everything you've missed", with details which "will still be getting discovered, decoded and debated in a few generations' time."

Year-end lists

Track listing

Personnel 
 Billy Woods – vocals
 Paul "Willie Green" Womack – mixing engineer, mastering engineer
 Tevin Prince – assistant engineer
 Jean Guillaume Daval – music arranger

References 

2022 albums
Billy Woods albums